Cleveland Publishing was an Australian digest paperback fiction publishing company that operated between 1953 and 2019.  The company was originally based at 276 Military Road, Cremorne, New South Wales.

History

The company's founder was John Patrick 'Jack' Atkins – a former secretary of the New South Wales Democratic Labor Party. Les Atkins – John Atkin's son – took control of the company in 1979.

Cleveland Publishing published novellas (24,000 to 48,000 words) in a number of genres. At peak the company produced 18 titles – 12 originals and six reprints – per month. Print runs for individual titles peaked at 25,000 copies. In all, close to 10,000 titles were published.

The genres published included crime, romance, war and westerns. The first three genre titles that were published under a number of series included: the Detective series, the Larry Kent series & the Silhouette Detective series. 

Other series that were published: the Enchanting series, the Diamond Library series, the Doctors and Nurses series, the Doctor Riley series, the Doctor Conway series, the Frontline series, the Raider series, the Commando series and the Patrol series.

Westerns

The western genre was the company's mainstay product and included the following series:

American Wild West
Arizona Western
The Avenger
Big Horn Western
Bison Western
Bobcat Western
Chisholm Western
Classic Western
Cleveland Western
Condor Western
Coronado Western
Dollar Western
Fighting Western
Halliday Western
High Brand Western
Iron Horse Western
Legends of the West
Lobo Western
Loner Western
Peacemaker Western
Phoenix Western
Pinto Western
Rawhide Western
Santa Fe Western
Sierra Western
Sundown Western
Texas Western
Top Hand Western
Tumbleweed Western
Winchester Western

Authors that contributed significantly to the western genre included:

 Des Dunn
 Roger Green
 Keith Hetherington
 Richard Wilkes-Hunter
 Len Meares
Paul Wheelahan

Each author was published under a number of pseudonyms.

References 

Book publishing companies of Australia
Australian companies established in 1953
Australian companies disestablished in 2020
Companies based in New South Wales